Sri Vasavi Institute of Engineering & Technology (SVIET) is an educational institute located at Nandamuru, 14km from Machilipatnam in the Indian state of Andhra Pradesh.

Executives
  CHAIRMAN - Sri Gudivada Ramachandra Rao
  SECRETARY - Sri Tadepalli Meher Baba
  CORRESPONDENT - Sri Kaky Kumar Babu
  EXECUTIVE DIRECTORS - Sri Tammana Sai Kumar/Sri Dosapati Baba
  PRINCIPAL - Dr. A.B.Srinivasa Rao

Campus
It is located on NH216, between Pedana and Bantumilli. SVIET is approved by AICTE, New Delhi and affiliated to JNTU, Kakinada.

References

External links 

Educational institutions established in 2008
2008 establishments in Andhra Pradesh
Universities and colleges in Krishna district
Engineering colleges in Krishna district
Engineering colleges in Andhra Pradesh
Engineering universities and colleges in India